U-Pass may refer to:

 Universal transit pass, a program that allows Canadian and US university students access to public transport with a special card
 U-Pass BC, the student card program in  British Columbia, Canada
 Upass (South Korea), a card used by public transport in Seoul, Korea